Anthony Norton (born 27 February 1950) is a British bobsledder. He competed in the four man event at the 1976 Winter Olympics.

References

1950 births
Living people
British male bobsledders
Olympic bobsledders of Great Britain
Bobsledders at the 1976 Winter Olympics
Place of birth missing (living people)